In algebraic geometry, a Gorenstein scheme is a locally Noetherian scheme whose local rings are all Gorenstein. The canonical line bundle is defined for any Gorenstein scheme over a field, and its properties are much the same as in the special case of smooth schemes.

Related properties

For a Gorenstein scheme X of finite type over a field, f: X → Spec(k), the dualizing complex f!(k) on X is a line bundle (called the canonical bundle KX), viewed as a complex in degree −dim(X). If X is smooth of dimension n over k, the canonical bundle KX can be identified with the line bundle Ωn of top-degree differential forms.

Using the canonical bundle, Serre duality takes the same form for Gorenstein schemes as it does for smooth schemes.

Let X be a normal scheme of finite type over a field k. Then X is regular outside a closed subset of codimension at least 2. Let U be the open subset where X is regular; then the canonical bundle KU is a line bundle. The restriction from the divisor class group Cl(X) to Cl(U) is an isomorphism, and (since U is smooth) Cl(U) can be identified with the Picard group Pic(U). As a result, KU defines a linear equivalence class of Weil divisors on X. Any such divisor is called the canonical divisor KX. For a normal scheme X, the canonical divisor KX is said to be Q-Cartier if some positive multiple of the Weil divisor KX is Cartier. (This property does not depend on the choice of Weil divisor in its linear equivalence class.) Alternatively, normal schemes X with KX Q-Cartier are sometimes said to be Q-Gorenstein.

It is also useful to consider the normal schemes X for which the canonical divisor KX is Cartier. Such a scheme is sometimes said to be Q-Gorenstein of index 1. (Some authors use "Gorenstein" for this property, but that can lead to confusion.) A normal scheme X is Gorenstein (as defined above) if and only if KX is Cartier and X is Cohen–Macaulay.

Examples

An algebraic variety with local complete intersection singularities, for example any hypersurface in a smooth variety, is Gorenstein.
A variety X with quotient singularities over a field of characteristic zero is Cohen–Macaulay, and KX is Q-Cartier. The quotient variety of a vector space V by a linear action of a finite group G is Gorenstein if G maps into the subgroup SL(V) of linear transformations of determinant 1. By contrast, if X is the quotient of C2 by the cyclic group of order n acting by scalars, then KX is not Cartier (and so X is not Gorenstein) for n ≥ 3.
Generalizing the previous example, every variety X with klt (Kawamata log terminal) singularities over a field of characteristic zero is Cohen–Macaulay, and KX is Q-Cartier.
If a variety X has log canonical singularities, then KX is Q-Cartier, but X need not be Cohen–Macaulay. For example, any affine cone X over an abelian variety Y is log canonical, and KX is Cartier, but X is not Cohen–Macaulay when Y has dimension at least 2.

Notes

References

External links

Algebraic geometry
Algebraic varieties
Scheme theory